The Heart Speaks in Whispers is the third studio album by English singer and songwriter Corinne Bailey Rae, released on 13 May 2016 by Virgin EMI Records.

Critical reception
{{Album ratings
| ADM = 6.9/10
| MC = 74/100
| rev1 = AllMusic
| rev1score = 
| rev2 = Drowned in Sound
| rev2score = 
| rev3 = The Guardian
| rev3score = 
| rev4 = The Independent| rev4score = 
| rev5 = musicOMH
| rev5score = 
| rev6 = PopMatters
| rev6score = 
| rev7 = Pitchfork Media
| rev7score = 7.6/10
|rev8      = Exclaim!|rev8score = 8/10
}}The Heart Speaks in Whispers received generally positive reviews from music critics. At Metacritic, which assigns a normalized rating out of 100 to reviews from mainstream critics, the album received an average score of 74 based on 17 reviews, which indicates "generally favorable reviews". In a positive review, Andy Kellman of AllMusic stated "The more electrified and groove-oriented material is bound to elicit parallels drawn to the likes of early Erykah Badu and, well, King." Writing for Exclaim!'', Ebyan Abdigir called the album "thoughtful and light, with an emotional range and sharp artistic direction that was lacking on her past records."

Commercial performance
In the United States, the album debuted at number 31 on the Billboard 200, selling 14,000 copies in its first week.

Track listing

Charts

Weekly charts

Year-end charts

References

2016 albums
Albums produced by Malay (record producer)
Corinne Bailey Rae albums
Virgin EMI Records albums